South Africa competed at the 2008 Summer Olympics in Beijing, People's Republic of China. The team included 136 athletes, as of 10 July 2008.
South Africa had its worst medals performance at an Olympics since 1994 (winter games), and tied its performance in the 1936 Games.

Medalists

Archery

South Africa sent archers to the Olympics for the fifth time, seeking the nation's first Olympic medal in the sport. Calvin Hartley earned the country its only qualifying spot, in the men's competition, by placing first in the 2008 African championship.

Athletics

Men
Track & road events

Field events

Women
Track & road events

Field events

Badminton

Boxing

South Africa qualified one boxer for the Olympic boxing tournament. Jackson Chauke earned a spot in the flyweight competition at the second African continental qualifying tournament.

Canoeing

Slalom

Sprint
Men

Women

Qualification Legend: QS = Qualify to semi-final; QF = Qualify directly to final

Cycling

Road

Mountain biking

BMX

Diving

Women

Fencing

Men

Women

Field hockey

Men's tournament

Team roster

Group play

Classification match for 11th/12th place

Women's tournament

Team roster

Group play

Classification match for 11th/12th place

Gymnastics

Rhythmic

Judo

Rowing

Men

Women

Qualification Legend: FA=Final A (medal); FB=Final B (non-medal); FC=Final C (non-medal); FD=Final D (non-medal); FE=Final E (non-medal); FF=Final F (non-medal); SA/B=Semifinals A/B; SC/D=Semifinals C/D; SE/F=Semifinals E/F; QF=Quarterfinals; R=Repechage

Sailing

Women

M = Medal race; EL = Eliminated – did not advance into the medal race; CAN = Race cancelled

Men

M = Medal race; EL = Eliminated – advanced into the medal race; CAN = Final Race cancelled

Shooting

Women

Swimming

Men

Women
Natalie du Toit, five time gold medallist at the Athens Paralympics in 2004, has qualified to compete, becoming the first amputee ever to qualify for the Olympic Games in the 10 kilometre open water race. She finished in 16th place.

Tennis

Triathlon

Volleyball

Beach

Weightlifting

Wrestling

Men's freestyle

References

Nations at the 2008 Summer Olympics
2008
Olympics